Mandhara is a small village in Tehsil Dadahu, Sirmaur District, Himachal Pradesh. There are about 30 families in this small village with approx 400 population.  The nearby Villages are Birla, Baila, Kando Kansar, Dabriya, etc.  This village is becoming an example of collective development, cooperation, solar and organics through a special development drive by LD Sharma, an entrepreneur who was born and brought up in the same village and who is now guiding all villagers to develop collectively. This village is around 35 km from Paonta Sahib, a place which is known for Sikh Gurudwaras.

There is a temple of Devi Bhadhrakshi. The temple is being rebuilt by LD Sharma through a registered committee named Mehta Vikas Jan Main Smiti and the latest updates can be seen online.

Villages in Sirmaur district